Lee Sargent is the former guitarist/backup vocalist for the indie rock band Clap Your Hands Say Yeah.

He attended college at Connecticut College along with the other members of Clap Your Hands Say Yeah. He is also the twin brother of CYHSY bassist Tyler Sargent.

In 2008, Sargent performed on James Lavino's score to the Alex Karpovsky film "Woodpecker."  The soundtrack also featured performances by Sargent's brother Tyler and by Radiohead bass player Colin Greenwood.

References

American rock singers
American rock guitarists
American male guitarists
American indie rock musicians
Connecticut College alumni
Living people
Year of birth missing (living people)
People from Hingham, Massachusetts